Katharine Lura Waitman (born October 24, 1956 in Palo Alto, California) is an American science fiction writer. She is best known for the Compton Crook Award winning The Merro Tree. Her second book was The Divided.

References

External links 
 

Writers from Palo Alto, California
1956 births
Living people
American women novelists
American science fiction writers
Women science fiction and fantasy writers
21st-century American women